Sebryakov is a rural locality (a khutor) in Tryasinovskoye Rural Settlement, Serafimovichsky District, Volgograd Oblast, Russia. The population was 2 as of 2010.

Geography 
Sebryakov is located in steppe, 5 km from the left bank of the Medveditsa River, 35 km northeast of Serafimovich (the district's administrative centre) by road. Podgorny is the nearest rural locality.

References 

Rural localities in Serafimovichsky District